Invasion Force is a science fiction action video game produced by the Tandy Corporation in June, 1979. Invasion Force was a text-based, real-time, Star Trek style game.

Gameplay 
The player is in control of the USS Hephaestus and must make decisions to manage resources, such as fuel and ammunition, so the ship does not become stranded in space while fending off "Jovian" attacks. There are 10 levels of difficulty.

Reception
Glenn Mai reviewed Invasion Force in The Space Gamer No. 36. Mai commented that "If you don't have a Star Trek game and want one, get Invasion Force."

Reviews
Moves #55, p31-32

References

External links
Review in Personal Computer World

 1979 video games
TRS-80 games
TRS-80-only games
Video games developed in the United States